The 1959 National Challenge Cup was the 46th edition of the United States Soccer Football Association's annual open soccer championship.

Overview
The McIlvaine Canvasbacks of San Pedro, California defeated Fall River SC in a contentious final.  McIlvaine scored three unanswered goals in the first half, but Fall River came back, tying the score in the 88th minute.  A minute later, Al Herman scored the winning goal for the Canvasbacks.  Fall River disputed the goal and the team's trainer, Abel Botelho attacked Herman, leading to Botelho's ejection.

Bracket

East

West

Final

External links
 1959 U.S. Open Cup – TheCup.us

Lamar Hunt U.S. Open Cup
U.S. Open Cup